Braz Chediak (born June 1, 1942, in Três Corações) is a Brazilian  actor, screenwriter and filmmaker.

With Aurélio Teixeira, he was responsible for the argument and the script of the film Mineirinho, Live or Dead (1967), and the adaptation of  Meu Pé de Laranja Lima in 1970. Of all the films that he directed include Razor in the Flesh, Two lost in a Dirty Night, Cute But Ordinary and Forgive Me for Betraying Me, among others.

He has chronicles published in several newspapers.

His tale The Golden Bit is published by Editora Record in the anthology Crime Made in Home.

His novel, Cortina de Sangue, is published by Editora Mirabolante and has great critical and public success.

References

External links
   
Biography on adorocinemabrasileiro.com

1942 births
Living people
People from Três Corações
Brazilian actors
Brazilian screenwriters
Brazilian filmmakers